Julie Katzman (Born December 6, 1961) was the Executive Vice-President and Chief Operating Officer of the Inter-American Development Bank.

Early career
After starting her career in Chicago and London, Katzman joined Lehman Brothers in New York in their high yield finance group where she worked on many high-profile M&A transactions in the late 1980s and the 1990s. She then moved to Lehman's private equity group where she was part of Lehman's first externally raised fund of $1.25 billion which had returns of over 35%, making investments in industries ranging from media to consumer products to defense. Katzman's experience as a director began while at Lehman Brothers, when, after leading Computervision Corporation's restructuring in 1992, she joined their board of directors. She also served as a member of Computervision's audit committee.  She later joined the boards of Loral Aerospace and Space Systems/Loral, serving on the audit committee, after the Lehman Fund and Loral Corporation completed the acquisition of The Ford Motor Company's $1.9 billion defense business.  Katzman left Lehman as one of the firm's youngest Managing Directors.

After leaving Lehman Brothers, she was a co-founder and partner of Violy, Byorum & Partners, a Latin America focused investment banking and strategic advisory firm.  While at VB&P, Katzman advised a number of the region's most influential business groups across a broad range of industries.

In government
At the Inter-American Development Bank, Katzman is Chief Operating Officer and manages the overall operations of the Bank, with over 4,000 staff and consultants and 29 offices.

Non-profit work
Katzman currently serves on the board of directors of the MacArthur Foundation, one of the 10 largest foundations in the United States with over $6 billion in assets.  She is the chairperson of the audit committee and is a member of foundation's investment and institutional policy (governance) committees.  Katzman also serves on other not for profit boards of directors including the Advisory Council of MIT Media Lab.

References

Living people
Inter-American Development Bank
American business executives
1961 births
People from Fall River, Massachusetts
Georgetown University alumni
Northwestern University alumni
American women business executives
International Center for Research on Women
21st-century American women